This is a list of Croatia women's national football team players with at least 20 appearances. Iva Landeka has made the most appearances for the national team with 96. Maja Joščak is the top goalscorer in the history of the Croatian team, with 20 goals.

Players

Players with at least 20 appearances
Appearances and goals are composed of FIFA Women's World Cup and UEFA Women's Championship and each competition's required qualification matches, as well as international friendlies. Players are listed by number of caps, then by goals scored. If they are still tied the players are listed alphabetically. Statistics correct as of 6 September 2022.

Notes

See also
Croatia women's national football team results
Croatia women's national football team#Current squad

References

External links
Croatian Football Federation official website

International footballers
Croatia
Association football player non-biographical articles
Football women
Football internationals